An annuity is a financial contract guaranteeing a series of regular payments made at equal intervals over a fixed period of time.

It may also refer to:

 Life annuity, an annuity in which the term is a person's lifetime
 Perpetuity, or perpetual annuity, an annuity from which payments continue indefinitely

See also 
 Annuities under American law
 Annuities under European law
 Annuities under Swiss law